SS Eleazar Wheelock was a Liberty ship built in the United States during World War II. She was named after Eleazar Wheelock, an American Congregational minister, orator, and educator in Lebanon, Connecticut, for 35 years before founding Dartmouth College in New Hampshire.  Before founding Dartmouth, Wheelock, in 1754, had founded and run the Moor's Charity School in Connecticut, to educate Native Americans.

Construction
Eleazar Wheelock was laid down on 4 March 1942, under a Maritime Commission (MARCOM) contract, MCE hull 38, by the Bethlehem-Fairfield Shipyard, Baltimore, Maryland; and was launched on 11 May 1942.

History
She was allocated to Calmar Steamship Corp., on 5 June 1942. On 24 September 1947, she was laid up in the National Defense Reserve Fleet, Wilmington, North Carolina. She was sold for scrapping on 10 August 1964, to Northern Metal Co.

References

Bibliography

 
 
 
 

 

Liberty ships
Ships built in Baltimore
1942 ships
Wilmington Reserve Fleet